This is a list of episodes from the seventh season of Barney Miller.

Broadcast history
The season originally aired Thursdays at 9:00–9:30 pm (EST).

Episodes

References

Barney Miller seasons
1980 American television seasons
1981 American television seasons